Sumana Shrestha is a Nepalese politician, belonging to the Rastriya Swatantra Party. She is currently serving as the member of the House of Representatives in the 2nd Federal Parliament of Nepal. In the 2022 election she was elected as a proportional representative under the Indigenous People category.

References

Living people
Nepal MPs 2022–present
Year of birth missing (living people)